D16 may refer to:

Vehicles

Aircraft
 Fokker D.XVI, a Dutch fighter aircraft
 Temco D-16, an American twin-engine civil utility aircraft

Locomotives
 BHP Port Kembla D16 class, an Australian diesel locomotive
 British Rail Class D16/1, two experimental diesel locomotives of 1947/8
 British Rail Class D16/2, three experimental diesel locomotives of 1950–54
 GSR Class D16, an Irish 4-4-0 steam locomotive class
 LNER Class D16, an English 4-4-0 steam locomotive class
 Pennsylvania Railroad class D16, an American 4-4-0 steam locomotive

Ships
 , a Cannon-class destroyer escort of the Brazilian Navy
 , a Fletcher-class destroyer of the Hellenic Navy
 , a N-class destroyer of the Royal Australian Navy
 , an I-class destroyer of the Royal Navy
 , a County-class destroyer of the Royal Navy

Other uses 
 Chondroma
 Dhuruvangal Pathinaaru, a 2016 Indian film
 Digital Bolex D16, a cinema camera
 Dublin 16, a postal district in Ireland
 Iceberg D-16, an Antarctic iceberg discovered in 2006
 D16 series of Honda D engines